Kalmar Cathedral is in the city of Kalmar in Småland in southeast Sweden.

History

The new city of Kalmar was built on Kvarnholmen island in the mid-17th century. The transfer from the old town was largely completed by 1658. The new, fortified town was planned along Renaissance ideals. Accordingly, the church and town hall were constructed across from one another in the old town square (Stortorget Kalmar).  The material in the masonry consists of limestone from Gotland. The vaults, portals and window coverings are made of brick. The roof was lined with copper plate. The cathedral was built without a dome and with high window openings.

The cathedral was designed by Nicodemus Tessin the Elder (1615–1681) and is one of the foremost examples of classical baroque architecture that was a breakthrough in Sweden.  The design of Kalmar Cathedral reflects the complexities of modernisation, maintaining liturgical utility and tradition, and being mindful of the fortress-city requirements. Construction began in 1660, but was interrupted on several occasions, including with the outbreak of the Scanian War (1675–1679). The work resumed after the war and Kalmar Cathedral was finally finished in 1703.

Restorations
Over the centuries, the church has been the subject of numerous restorations

In 1783, extensive external and internal restoration was initiated.  In 1800, the city was hit by an extensive fire.  In 1802 the damage was repaired.  In 1831–1834, an external and internal restoration was carried out following a proposal by architect Jacob Wilhelm Gerss (1784-1844).  The exterior restoration included both the church's exterior walls and the roof.

In 1882–1883, a rebuilding of the interior was carried out following a drawing proposal by architect Helgo Zetterwall (1831-1907).   
During 1910–1914 years of restoration took place according to drawings and job descriptions by city architect Josef Fredrik Olson (1870-1947). 
The 1928-1932 restoration was also based on Fredrik Olson's proposal.
  
Between 1981 and 1982, extensive restoration of the church's exterior was made. Between 2005 and 2011, restoration of the exterior took place,
under the direction of Barup & Edström Arkitektkontor. Work included refurbishment of the church roof, stone restoration, facade staining. Internal restoration during 2006-2011 meant, among other things, raising and expanding the choir as well as new flooring.

Gallery

References

Related reading
K. Neville (2009) Nicodemus Tessin the Elder. Architecture in Sweden in the Age of Greatness (Turnhout, Brepols Publishers)

External links
Kalmar domkyrka website

Lutheran cathedrals in Sweden
Churches in Kalmar County
Kalmar
Churches in the Diocese of Växjö
Church buildings with domes